Enravota Glacier is the 10 km long and 3.5 km wide glacier on Nordenskjöld Coast in Graham Land situated southwest of Vrachesh Glacier and north of lower Drygalski Glacier.  It drains the south slopes of Ruth Ridge, and flows southeastwards to join Drygalski Glacier east of Bekker Nunataks.  The feature is named after the Bulgarian prince St. Boyan-Enravota (9th century).

Location
British mapping in 1978.

Maps

 British Antarctic Territory.  Scale 1:200000 topographic map.  DOS 610 Series, Sheet W 64 60.  Directorate of Overseas Surveys, Tolworth, UK, 1978.
 Antarctic Digital Database (ADD). Scale 1:250000 topographic map of Antarctica. Scientific Committee on Antarctic Research (SCAR). Since 1993, regularly upgraded and updated.

References
 Enravota Glacier. SCAR Composite Antarctic Gazetteer.
 Bulgarian Antarctic Gazetteer. Antarctic Place-names Commission. (details in Bulgarian, basic data in English)

External links
 Enravota Glacier. Copernix satellite image

Bulgaria and the Antarctic
Glaciers of Nordenskjöld Coast